Lukovica is a village in the municipality of Makedonska Kamenica, North Macedonia.

Demographics
As of the 2021 census, Lukovica had 297 residents with the following ethnic composition:
Macedonians 279
Persons for whom data are taken from administrative sources 13
Others 5

According to the 2002 census, the village had a total of 269 inhabitants. Ethnic groups in the village include:
Macedonians 269

References

Villages in Makedonska Kamenica Municipality